O Mahurangi Penlink (Peninsula Link) is the name for the road currently under construction which will create a more direct and quicker route between the Whangaparāoa Peninsula and central Auckland in New Zealand.

Concept
The road would provide a second access route off the Whangaparāoa Peninsula, and is claimed by some to be needed to unlock large amounts of commercial land, contribute up to $173 million to GDP during its construction, and create employment estimated at more than 5000 jobs. 

The project's planning was originally being undertaken by Rodney District Council, Auckland Regional Council, and Transit New Zealand before 2010. With the creation of the Auckland Supercity on 1 November 2010, the project now sits with Auckland Council and its transport entity Auckland Transport.

Penlink would be approximately 7 km long and connect Whangaparaoa Peninsula with State Highway 1 at Redvale, effectively connecting the urban area of Hibiscus Coast and Bays, which runs from Waiwera south down the eastern coastline to Campbells Bay. The potential growth of the region is hampered by the Silverdale Motorway Interchange which is the traffic pinch point. Penlink addresses this and will include other modes such as public transport, walking and cycling.

Initially proposed as a toll road, it was later envisaged that it would be paid for by a part of the income from a regional fuel tax; but in 2018 was again changed to the toll option.

In 2020, it was announced that the New Zealand Government would fund the road through the New Zealand Upgrade Programme.

Status
 All the land has been designated and property purchased. 
 Auckland Council owns the project and ratepayers will be reimbursed all costs to date. 
 Penlink is funded through the New Zealand Upgrade Programme, and managed by the NZ Transport Agency (formerly managed by Auckland Transport). 
 Construction began in late 2022, with the road projected to open from 2026.

References

External links 
 https://web.archive.org/web/20130209023724/http://www.aucklandtransport.govt.nz/improving-transport/penlink/Pages/default.aspx

Transport in Auckland
Proposed roads in New Zealand